İsmail Türüt (born 8 June 1965) is a Turkish male Turkish folk music artist from the Black Sea Region.

"Plan Yapmayın Plan" controversy 

His 2007 album, Dünya Tatlısı, contains a song named Plans, don't make any plans , which created a major controversy in Turkey.

The lyrics take aim at Americans, Russians, Kurds, Christians, Armenians and the Turks who support them, telling them not to make plans against the Black Sea region of Turkey. The lyrics praise Ogün Samast and Yasin Hayal, the alleged killers of the Armenian-Turkish journalist Hrant Dink and end with "If a person betrays the country, he is finished off".

Whereas the song does not name Ogün, Yasin and Hrant Dink explicitly, a video clip posted on YouTube shows images of Ogün, Yasin, and Hrant Dink throughout the song.

Hakan Öztekin of Çarşamba claimed responsibility for making the video clip. He claims that he didn't have a political motive when creating the clip, but created the clip as a hobbyist.

Discography

Albums
Laz Uşağı
 Komşu Kızı Laz mısın Çerkez misin
Ondan Kaynana Olmaz
Çay Güzeli
 Güzellere Bayram Var Hamsi
Kara Sevdalı Fatma
Zorla Güzellik Olmaz
Oy Canan
Akıllı Ol
Hamsi Gözlüm
Suzan
Deniz Gözlüm
Karadeniz Sofrası
Piryoz
Deli Zekiye
Dünya Tatlısı
Kırktan Sonra
Dört Mevsim

Notes

External links
Official website

1965 births
Living people
Turkish folk musicians
Turkish male songwriters
Turkish composers
Bow makers
Turkish classical kemençe players
Turkish television presenters
Turkish television talk show hosts
Turkish male television actors
Turkish film score composers
Turkish classical violinists
20th-century Turkish male actors 
21st-century Turkish male actors
Kemençe players
Bagpipe players
Bağlama players
Idealism (Turkey)
People from Rize
Performers of Islamic music
Turkish lyricists
20th-century Turkish male musicians
21st-century Turkish male musicians
Turkish nationalists
Nationalist musicians